In mathematics, the cone condition is a property which may be satisfied by a subset of a Euclidean space. Informally, it requires that for each point in the subset a cone with vertex in that point must be contained in the subset itself, and so the subset is "non-flat".

Formal definitions 
Here  represents a cone with vertex in the origin, constant opening, axis given by the vector , and height . 

 satisfies the strong cone condition if there exists an open cover  of  such that for each  there exists a cone such that .

References 
 

Euclidean geometry